Kerrin Anne Lee-Gartner (born September 21, 1966) is a former World Cup alpine ski racer and Olympic gold medallist from Canada.

Born in Trail, British Columbia, she grew up in Rossland and raced as a youngster at Red Mountain. Lee-Gartner started skiing for the Canadian Women's Ski Team in 1982, but suffered a number of knee operations over the years including two complete reconstructions. She attained her first World Cup podium early in December 1990, then had five more top-six finishes early in the 1992 season entering the Winter Olympics in Albertville, France.

On the Roc de Fer course at Méribel, Lee-Gartner won the gold medal in the Olympic downhill. Only 0.06 seconds behind was silver medallist Hilary Lindh of the U.S., for a North American 1–2 finish. Through 2018, it remains the only victory in an Olympic downhill by a Canadian. She finished sixth in the Olympic super-G and had two more podiums after the Olympics, both in North America, to finish up the 1992 season.

Lee-Gartner's next season in 1993 was her best on the World Cup circuit, with two podiums and twelve top tens. She finished third in the downhill standings and ninth overall. At the World Championships in Japan, she was fourth in the super-G and ninth in the downhill.

Leading up to the 1994 Winter Olympics, Lee-Gartner was admittedly affected by the death of her friend Ulrike Maier after a crash in a downhill race in late January. At the Olympics in Norway, she finished eighth in the super-G and 19th in the downhill, and retired from international competition a month later, at the end of the 1994 World Cup season.

Lee-Gartner is currently a  television broadcaster with CBC Sports in Canada. She also assisted the BBC with coverage of the 2010 Winter Olympics in Vancouver.

World Cup results

Season standings

Race podiums

 6 podiums – (4 DH, 2 SG)

World Championship results

Olympic results

Video
CBC interview – following her Olympic gold medal run, February 1992

Personal
During May 2018, Lee-Gartner was part of a group of four female athletes, including Cassie Campbell, Jen Kish and Fran Rider to publicly pledge their brain to a Canadian research centre. The posthumous donation shall be made to Toronto Western Hospital’s Canadian Concussion Centre to further research on the effect of trauma on women's brains.

References

External links
 
 
 
 
 
  – Kerrin Lee-Gartner
 

Canadian female alpine skiers
Olympic gold medalists for Canada
Canadian people of German descent
Alpine skiers at the 1992 Winter Olympics
Alpine skiers at the 1994 Winter Olympics
Sportspeople from British Columbia
People from Rossland, British Columbia
1966 births
Living people
Alpine skiers at the 1988 Winter Olympics
Olympic medalists in alpine skiing
Medalists at the 1992 Winter Olympics
Olympic alpine skiers of Canada